Bürcəli is a village and municipality in the Lankaran Rayon of Azerbaijan. It has a population of 2,104.

References

Populated places in Lankaran District